UserVoice is a San Franciscobased Software-as-a-Service (SaaS) company that develops customer engagement tools.

History

UserVoice began in 2006, when programmer Richard White decided to create a more efficient way to monitor feedback from software users. He created an online forum for users to provide ideas about a project he was designing. White asked users to vote, instead of using programmers, a method inspired by Joel Spolsky, who advocated giving programmers a finite number of votes to prioritize software development.  White, together with Lance Ivy and Marcus Nelson, launched UserVoice in February 2008. An early adopter was Stack Overflow, run by Spolsky. UserVoice had 13 employees and 4,000 clients, with 23 million users participating by 2011.

Slack, Salesforce, Marketo, HubSpot, zendesk, Jira, Azure DevOps, Microsoft Dynamics, Zapier, Fivetran, Stitch and Amazon Redshift are among the adopters of UserVoice's platform.

Products

UserVoice Feedback collects and prioritizes suggestions from customers as they list ideas and vote on them. This voting can occur through the SmartVote comparison testing feature. In addition to the original website-style product, iPhone and Facebook apps are available to allow developers to collect feedback for mobile apps.

UserVoice HelpDesk is a support tool for tracking and responding to customer issues. Customers can thank the support person who responds to their ticket by giving them "kudos." The system employs gamification techniques to motivate support teams to provide high quality service. Help teams work within a system that displays each person's kudos in real-time. UserVoice HelpDesk also directs customers to relevant answers as they type questions.

See also
 Get Satisfaction
 Issue tracking system

References

External links
 

Software companies based in the San Francisco Bay Area
Software companies established in 2008
Automation software
Help desk software
2008 establishments in California